A release liner or release paper is a paper or plastic-based film sheet (usually applied during the manufacturing process) used to prevent a sticky surface from prematurely adhering. It is coated on one or both sides with a release agent, which provides a release effect against any type of a sticky material such as an adhesive or a mastic. Release liners are available in different colors, with or without printing under the low surface energy coating or on the backside of the liner. Release is  separation of the liner from a sticky material; liner is the carrier for the release agent.

Industry segmentation
Globally there are between 400 and 500 companies involved in making or dealing with release liner products on an industrial scale. In general there are two types of companies which are manufacturing release liner.

Liner producer 
 
Commercial coating companies deal with a lot of different end uses of this industry. They provide unique solutions to their customers, based on a wide variety of substrates and an endless combination of release agents with specialized properties. Commercial coaters usually do not make finished products, just the release liner itself and then their customers will coat a sticky material on this liner and then apply the end product to it.

In-house producer 
An in-house producer makes the release liner and uses it internally to manufacture the final product. In-house producers are typically focused on a very narrow range of products e.g. labels or tapes. They use a limited amount of substrates and release materials, which are specialized for their end applications.

Liner materials
As liner material, the industry is using a wide variety of so-called substrates, which are the carrier materials of the release agent and which is needed to transport a sticky material from the manufacturer to an industrial or private end user. Typical liner materials are:

Paper 

 SCK - Super calendered Kraft paper, typically used for labels in the USA
 Glassine - Is also a SCK paper but typically with a polyvinyl alcohol (PVOH) top coat, typically used for labels in Europe
 CCK - Clay coated Kraft paper or also just called coated paper
 MFK - Machine finished Kraft paper, which is the paper as it comes from a standard paper machine
 MG - Machine glazed paper which is a paper which has been glazed, e.g. on a Yankee cylinder of a paper machine

Plastic film 
 BO-PET: a PET film (biaxially oriented) is a very high temperature resistant and tough film liner
 BOPP: a biaxially oriented polypropylene (PP) film
 Other polyolefins: typically made out of high density polyethylene (HDPE), low density polyethylene (LDPE), PP plastic resins

Plastic films in general are made out of plastic resins by a plastics extrusion process and can be made out of one single type of plastic material, a blend of different plastic materials or multilayered coextrusions. Providing them with unique and adjusted features for the application that they are targeted for.

Others 
 Poly coated Kraft papers, which are typically MFK papers which have a polyolefin coating on one or both sides, to make them very smooth, moisture resistant and dimensionally stable.
 Poly coated BO-PET film, which is a BO-PET film that has been coated on both sides with a polyolefin material. This way the tough and dimensionally stable PET film is combined with cheap polyolefin resin which makes the film a better carrier web for specialty applications.

Release agents
Commonly used release agents for release liner can be crosslinkable silicone, other coatings, and materials that have a low surface energy.

Applications

There are probably hundreds of different applications, where release liner materials are being used. Such as

 Pressure-sensitive labels
 Pressure-sensitive tape
 Self-adhesive plastic sheet
 Embossed release paper known as casting paper is used in the manufacture of textured materials, including bicast leather and artificial leather

See also
 Pressure-sensitive adhesive

References

Adhesives